Narrow Water Forest is a mixed broadleaf and coniferous forest located between Newry and  Warrenpoint, Count Down, Northern Ireland.

References

Forests and woodlands of Northern Ireland